AniZona was an annual anime convention based in Arizona that took place annually on Easter weekend (from Thursday to Sunday), hosted by AniZona Inc., a non-profit volunteer organization. The convention is no longer being run.  The inaugural convention, also the first full-scale anime convention to be held in the state, occurred between March 25 and 27, 2005 at the Embassy Suites in Phoenix.

Events
Popular events included a Cosplay Contest, a Karaoke Contest, and an Anime Music Video Contest. AniZona featured numerous programming items involving voice actors in the anime industry, generally from North America, as well as webcomic artists, though the main Guest of Honor for the first convention was Yoshitaka Amano, and at least one Japanese guest, manga artist Haruka Miyabi, has been confirmed by the convention for the third AniZona. Sponsors have included distributors in the North American anime industry as well as local businesses in the Phoenix metropolitan area.

History
The convention was founded by Anthony Grutta (who served as convention chair for the first year), David Hungerford, and Jason Bustard. AniZona was the first convention dedicated to anime in the state. Although numerous small-scale anime and anime-related festivals had been held, there had not been any anime-specific conventions in Arizona.

After two years at the Embassy Suites Phoenix North, the third AniZona was held at the Phoenix Marriott Mesa and Convention Center in Mesa, Arizona, April 5–8, 2007. There is an attendance cap for the convention. Pre-registration for AniZona 1 was capped at 800–850 attendees, although actual attendance was estimated at higher due to a limited number of at-the-door registrations sold.

Event history

References

Defunct anime conventions